Enock Koech (born 4 April 1981) is a Kenyan long-distance runner. At the 2001 World Cross Country Championships he won the short race, while the Kenyan team of which he was a part won the team competition as well.

External links
 (old version)

1981 births
Living people
Kenyan male long-distance runners
World Athletics Cross Country Championships winners
Kenyan male cross country runners